Business Insiders is a business news talk show aired weekdays from 6 to 6:30 PM ET on CNBC between 1992 and 1997. The show was hosted by Ron Insana and Neil Cavuto.

References

CNBC original programming
American television news shows
Year of television series debut missing
1990s American television talk shows
Year of television series ending missing
Business-related television series
1997 American television series endings